Guido Vianello (born 9 May 1994) is an Italian professional boxer. As an amateur he competed in the men's super-heavyweight event at the 2016 Summer Olympics.

Vianello was an athlete of the Gruppo Sportivo Forestale (from 2013 to 2016). From 1 January 2017, the G.S. Forestale merged with the Centro Sportivo Carabinieri, therefore Vianello became an athlete of the C.S. Carabinieri.

Professional boxing record

References

External links
 

1994 births
Living people
Italian male boxers
Olympic boxers of Italy
Boxers at the 2016 Summer Olympics
Competitors at the 2018 Mediterranean Games
Boxers from Rome
Boxers at the 2015 European Games
European Games competitors for Italy
Boxers of Gruppo Sportivo Forestale
Boxers of Centro Sportivo Carabinieri
Heavyweight boxers
Super-heavyweight boxers
Mediterranean Games competitors for Italy